Sydney Parham Epes (August 20, 1865 – March 3, 1900) was a U.S. Representative from Virginia, cousin of James F. Epes and William Bacon Oliver.

Biography
Born near Nottoway Court House, Virginia, Epes moved with his parents to Kentucky and settled near Franklin, Kentucky, where he attended the public schools.  He returned to Virginia in 1884 and edited and published a Democratic newspaper at Blackstone, Virginia.  He served as member of the Virginia House of Delegates in 1891 and 1892.  He served as register of the Virginia land office from 1895 to 1897, and presented credentials as a Member-elect to the Fifty-fifth Congress and served from March 4, 1897, until March 23, 1898, when he was succeeded by Robert T. Thorp, who contested the election.

Epes was elected as a Democrat to the Fifty-sixth Congress and served from March 4, 1899, until his death from peritonitis in Washington, D.C., March 3, 1900.  He was interred in Lake View Cemetery, Blackstone, Virginia.

Elections

1896; Epes was elected to the U.S. House of Representatives with 54.5% of the vote, defeating Republican Robert Taylor Thorp and Independent Republican J.L. Thorp; however, the election was invalidated and Robert Taylor Thorp was seated.
1898; Epes was elected again with 57.5% of the vote, defeating Republicans Thorp and Booker Ellis, ColR (?) Thomas L. Jones, and Independent J.H. Beran.

See also
List of United States Congress members who died in office (1900–1949)

Sources

External links 
 

1865 births
1900 deaths
Democratic Party members of the Virginia House of Delegates
People from Nottoway County, Virginia
Democratic Party members of the United States House of Representatives from Virginia
19th-century American politicians
Deaths from peritonitis